Ophioglossolambis itsumiae is a species of true conch from the Mascarene Islands (Mauritius, Rodrigues, and Réunion) and Saint Brandon (also known as Cargados Carajos) Shoals in the western Indian Ocean. It was described in August 2021.

References

Strombidae
Gastropods described in 2021